Kohneh Gurab (also Romanized as Kohneh Gūrāb and Kohneh Goorab; also known as Kohneh Gorāb) is a village in Amlash-e Shomali Rural District, in the Central District of Amlash County, Gilan Province, Iran. At the 2006 census, its population was 209, in 69 families.

References 

Populated places in Amlash County